The 37th Guam Legislature is the current meeting of the Guam Legislature that convened in Hagatna, Guam on January 2, 2023, during Lou Leon Guerrero's Governorship.In the 2022 Guam election, the Democratic Party of Guam won a majority of seats in the Guam Legislature.

Party Summary

Leadership

Legislative 

 Speaker: Therese M. Terlaje
 Vice Speaker: Tina Rose Muña Barnes
 Legislative Secretary: Amanda Shelton

Minority (Republican) 

 Minority Leader: Frank Blas Jr
 Minority Whip: Telo T. Taitague

Membership

Committees

References

Legislature of Guam